Soul rock may refer to:
 Psychedelic soul, a music genre where black soul musicians embrace elements of psychedelic rock
 Brown-eyed soul, a subgenre performed in the United States mainly by Latinos in Southern California
 Cinematic soul, a music genre combining traditional rock/soul arrangements with orchestral instruments
 Plastic soul, soul music that is believed to lack authenticity
 Progressive soul, soul music that takes inspiration from progressive rock bands/artists.

See also
 Rock and Soul (disambiguation)
 Soul Rocker, a Mexican luchador
 "Soul Rock", a song by Billy Ocean
 Rubber Soul, a 1965 album by the Beatles
 Let's Dance (David Bowie album), a 1983 album by David Bowie
 Young Americans, 1975 album by David Bowie
 Blue-eyed soul, rhythm and blues and soul music performed by white artists